The Sohoton Caves and Natural Bridge Park is a protected natural area about 841 hectares and a tourist attraction within the Samar Island Natural Park. The natural park features caves, subterranean rivers, waterfalls, limestone formations, thick forest and a natural stone bridge. It is just a small portion of the Samar Island National Park covering the 3 provinces namely Northern Samar, Eastern Samar and Samar (formerly Western Samar). The entire area is 455,700 hectares, home of the various wildlife, rivers and cave connections. It is located at Brgy. Guirang, Basey and has an area of approximately 840-hectares. First established as the Sohoton Natural Bridge National Park in 1935, it was then renamed as the Sohoton Cave Natural Park, and finally to the Sohoton Cave and Natural Bridge.

References

Karst caves
Caves of Samar Island Natural Park
Natural arches of the Philippines
Basey